St. Charles is a town in the Canadian province of Ontario, located in the Sudbury District.

It was created on January 1, 1999 by amalgamating the political townships of Casimir, Jennings and Appleby as well as a strip of unorganized territory on the West Arm of Lake Nipissing. Along with the municipalities of Markstay-Warren and French River, it is part of the region known as Sudbury East.

The town had a population of 1,269 in the Canada 2016 Census. Franco-Ontarians, or Ontarians who speak French as their mother tongue, make up the majority of the population.

In addition to the primary townsite at St. Charles, the municipality also includes the smaller communities of Casimir and West Arm.

Demographics 

See also
List of townships in Ontario
List of francophone communities in Ontario

References

External links

Municipalities in Sudbury District
Single-tier municipalities in Ontario